Toro sub-region is a region in Uganda that is coterminous with Toro Kingdom in Western Uganda. The districts that constitute the sub-region include the following:

 Bunyangabu District
 Kabarole District
 Kamwenge District
 Kyegegwa District
 Kyenjojo District
 Kitagwenda District

Prior to 1967, the sub-region also included:
 Bundibugyo District
 Kasese District
 Ntoroko District

In 1967, Milton Obote abolished the Uganda traditional monarchies. When Yoweri Museveni restored them in 1993, the sub-region had shrunk to its present size after Obudhingiya bwa Bwamba in Bundibugyo district and Obusinga bwa Rwenzururu in Kasese district became independent. The sub-region was home to an estimated 1 million people in 2002, according to the national census conducted that year.

References

 
Sub-regions of Uganda